A by-election was held in the Czech Republic on 5 and 6 April 2019 for the Prague 9 Senate seat. The incumbent Senator Zuzana Baudyšová, elected as a candidate of ANO 2011, announced her resignation on 29 January 2019 due to health problems. Jan Jarolím and David Smoljak advanced to the second round. Smoljak was eventually elected the new Senator.

Background
The previous election was held in 2014, with Zuzana Baudyšová elected the new Senator, nominated by ANO 2011. She resigned from the position on 29 January 2019, due to health difficulties. The new election was set for 5 and 6 April 2019.

Nominations closed on 18 February 2019, with ten candidates nominated. The Civic Democratic Party nominated Mayor of Prague 9 Jan Jarolím, who also received support from the Christian and Democratic Union – Czechoslovak People's Party. The Czech Pirate Party nominated local politician Petr Daubner, who was also endorsed by the Czech Social Democratic Party and the Green Party. Mayors and Independents nominated David Smoljak, a screenwriter and son of Ladislav Smoljak. TOP 09 nominated Martin Kroh. ANO 2011 nominated security specialist and lecturer Martin Hrubčík.

Candidates

Campaign
Petr Daubner announced his candidacy on 18 February 2019. He is nominated by the Czech Pirate Party and supported by Czech Social Democratic Party, Green Party and Senator 21. He stated that he would focus on defence of democracy and education.

David Smoljak announced his candidacy on 19 February 2019 as a nominee of Mayors and Independents. Former Senator Libor Michálek also announced his candidacy on 19 February 2019. He previously served as a member of the Senate but was defeated in the 2018 election.

Mayor of Prague 9 Jan Jarolím announced his candidacy on 28 February 2019. He is nominated by the Civic Democratic Party and supported by Christian and Democratic Union – Czechoslovak People's Party and Svobodní. Jarolím stated that he wants to focus on the environment and support for municipalities if he gets elected.

Former Social Democratic Senator for Prague 4 Eva Syková, who was defeated in the 2018 Senate election, is a candidate for Prague 9 Senator as the nominee of For Health and Sport. She announced her candidacy on 27 February 2019.

Jan Jarolím and David Smoljak advanced to the second round.

Opinion polls

Knowledge of candidates

Betting odds
Fortuna agency viewed Jan Jarolím as the front-runner due to his results in the 2018 municipal election, during which he led ODS to a clear victory in Prague 9 district. Petr Daubner and Martin Hrubčík were viewed as his strongest opponents.

Results

References

2019 elections in the Czech Republic
2019
April 2019 events in the Czech Republic
2010s in Prague